Hong Chau (born June 25, 1979) is an American actress who is most known for her performance in the 2022 film The Whale, for which she was nominated for the Academy Award for Best Supporting Actress and other supporting-actress awards. Her breakthrough role was in the 2017 film Downsizing, for which she was nominated for several supporting-actress awards. Variety wrote in 2022 that Chau had "been prolific in recent years" and that she had "an acclaimed turn" in the TV series Watchmen (2019) and Homecoming (2018–2020).

Before Downsizing, she appeared in the TV series Treme (2010–2013) and the film Inherent Vice (2014). In 2018, she had guest star roles in several TV series. In 2019, she played a supporting role in the limited series Watchmen, and had leading roles in the films American Woman and Driveways. In 2020, she had a starring role in the second season of the TV series Homecoming, having had a supporting role in its first season in 2018. In 2022, she appeared in supporting roles in the films Showing Up, The Menu, and The Whale.

Chau was born to Vietnamese parents who lived in a refugee camp in Thailand after fleeing Vietnam in the late 1970s. A Vietnamese Catholic church in New Orleans, Louisiana sponsored Chau and her family to move to the United States. She grew up in New Orleans and majored in film studies at Boston University College of Communication before pursuing an acting career.

Early life
Before Hong Chau was born, her parents and her two brothers lived in Vietnam. In 1979, the family was among the Vietnamese boat people who fled their country, and Chau's mother was six months pregnant with her. During their escape, Chau's father was shot and nearly bled to death. Chau was born in a refugee camp in Thailand on June 25 that year. A Vietnamese Catholic church in New Orleans, Louisiana in the United States arranged for a local Vietnamese family to sponsor her family. Chau grew up speaking Vietnamese as her first language, and later learned English in school. Her family lived in government housing and used subsidized lunch programs.

Chau was raised in New Orleans East and attended Eleanor McMain Secondary School, Benjamin Franklin High School, and then Louisiana School for Math, Science, and the Arts; the first two are in New Orleans and the latter, from which Chau graduated from, is in Natchitoches, Louisiana. Her parents worked as dishwashers then ran a convenience store, working to ensure that the children could attend college. Chau said her parents, who speak in heavy Vietnamese accents, were shunned as Asian migrants. She said, "My whole life, I've always felt like I was the more acceptable of my parents, and they were always the people who had to stay in the background, or hide in the broom closet."

Receiving Pell Grants, Chau attended Boston University in Boston, Massachusetts, where she initially studied creative writing. She changed her major to film studies when her parents requested that she study something more practical. She explored acting to challenge her introversion; she acted in other students' short films and was encouraged to pursue acting. She graduated from Boston University College of Communication with her film-studies major in 2001. After college, Chau got a job with PBS and anticipated a career in documentaries. Chau started taking public speaking classes to overcome being introverted, which led to improv classes. When Chau met a sitcom TV director, he encouraged her to move to Los Angeles and to get in contact with him. Chau decided to move to LA and began seeking acting opportunities there.

Career

2006–2017: Early work and breakthrough with Downsizing
Chau began acting in film and TV in 2006. One of her first major roles was in the TV series Treme (2010–2013), which was set in New Orleans. Her first feature film role was in the 2014 film Inherent Vice. For two years after her role, she was not able to get an audition for another film role. In 2015, she had a key role in the Off-Broadway play John; she credited the experience for strengthening her acting. She also had a supporting role in the 2017 premiere season of the TV series Big Little Lies. She subsequently appeared in a supporting role in the 2017 film Downsizing, for which her performance was described as a standout by several reviews. She was nominated for several awards for best supporting actress (see accolades). Some criticized her character Ngoc Lan Tran as stereotypical because Chau spoke in broken English, but Chau said that she found her character "so multifaceted and complex and well-written".

2018–2020: Further success and leading roles

Following Downsizing, in 2018, Hong Chau was one of 928 new members invited by the Academy of Motion Picture Arts and Sciences. She appeared in guest roles in several TV series, including BoJack Horseman and Forever. She had a supporting role as a corporate secretary in the first season of the TV series Homecoming. The Ringers Alison Herman said another actor would have sought to accumulate more recurring roles on TV series. Herman said, "In the Peak TV Era, Chau opted for something much savvier: taking some choice guest parts in a few critically acclaimed TV shows ... Chau benefits from these shows' prestige; the shows benefit from her talents." In 2019, The Hollywood Reporters Rebecca Sun said since Downsizing, "Chau has appeared in a series of critically acclaimed projects."

Chau had her first leading roles in the films Driveways and American Woman, both released at film festivals in 2019. For Driveways, Chau was familiar with director Andrew Ahn's previous film Spa Night, recognized his name when he contacted her with an offer for the role, and readily accepted the offer. Also in 2019, Chau appeared in the limited series Watchmen as the trillionaire Lady Trieu, whose performance The Hollywood Reporters TV critic Tim Goodman said was one of the series' "exceptional, memorable performances". Following the 2020 video-on-demand release of Driveways, Rolling Stones Maria Fontoura wrote that Chau has a "cool tenacity" in her roles. Fontoura said, "Whether she's playing a mysterious mogul, a secretive secretary, or a grieving single mother, the actress is steely, whip-smart, and deceptively powerful."

In May 2020, Chau had a larger role in Homecomings second season, in which she moves from secretary to a person in charge in the series's featured corporation. Entertainment Tonights Stacy Lambe said Chau "has become something of a scene stealer over the years". Lambe said, "What's notable about most of her projects is that they feature a diverse cast of actors of color who get to shine in unexpected ways," highlighting Treme, Watchmen, and Homecoming. While Chau had filmed a small part as Opal Koboi in the 2020 film Artemis Fowl, her appearance was ultimately cut. Her character's voice was used, but Chau was not officially credited. Her deleted scene became available on Disney+.

2021 to present: Oscar nomination for The Whale role
Chau spent most of 2020 in a COVID-19 lockdown due to the COVID-19 pandemic in the United States, giving birth to a daughter in November of that year. In 2021, she acted in the filming of four films: The Whale, Showing Up, The Menu, and Asteroid City. For The Whale, she was invited by its director Darren Aronofsky to audition for a role. For The Menu, Chau was a fan of the TV series Succession and wanted to work with director Mark Mylod, who had directed over a dozen episodes in the series. She also wanted to work with actor Ralph Fiennes. For Asteroid City, its director Wes Anderson saw Chau in a play about five years prior and remembered her performance and sought an opportunity to cast her.

Showing Up premiered in May 2022 at the 2022 Cannes Film Festival, while in September 2022, The Whale premiered at the 79th Venice International Film Festival, and The Menu premiered at the 2022 Toronto International Film Festival. Chau said she gives directors "a wide range of line readings and reactions each time they call 'action'". Variety wrote, "It's resulted in a string of performances of remarkable versatility, star turns." With The Whale being commercially released in theaters in December 2022, Chau was nominated for the Academy Award for Best Supporting Actress.

Chau appeared as a guest star in an episode of the TV series Poker Face, which premiered in January 2023.

Upcoming appearances
Chau will appear in the TV series The Night Agent, which premieres on March 23, 2023. Chau is also set to appear in Asteroid City, to be released in June 2023. In October 2022, she was cast in the film And. In February 2023, she, Matt Damon, and Casey Affleck were cast in the crime film The Instigators to be directed by Doug Liman.

Acting credits

Film

TV

Stage

Accolades 

Chau had a supporting role in the 2017 film Downsizing and was nominated for several awards for best supporting actress, including Golden Globe Award for Best Supporting Actress – Motion Picture and Screen Actors Guild Award for Outstanding Performance by a Female Actor in a Supporting Role. Considered a probable nominee for the Academy Award for Best Supporting Actress at the 90th Academy Awards, she was not nominated. USA Todays Andrea Mandell said, "Hong Chau was snubbed ... a nomination many had assumed was a lock given the strength of her performance as a Vietnamese refugee."

Chau also had a supporting role in the 2022 film The Whale and was nominated for the Academy Award for Best Supporting Actress for the first time. She was also nominated for other supporting-actress awards including the Gotham Independent Film Award for Outstanding Supporting Performance, the BAFTA Award for Best Actress in a Supporting Role, and the SAG Award for Outstanding Performance by a Female Actor in a Supporting Role.

Personal life
, she has a dog, a Rottweiler-Australian Shepherd mix.

In November 2020, Chau gave birth to a daughter.

See also 
 Asian Americans in arts and entertainment
 List of Asian Academy Award winners and nominees

Notes

References

External links

1979 births
Living people
Actresses of Vietnamese descent
American people of Vietnamese descent
American film actresses
American television actresses
Boston University alumni
Boston University College of Communication alumni
Actresses from New Orleans
21st-century American actresses
Vietnamese emigrants to the United States
People with acquired American citizenship